The Spanish language began to be used in New Zealand with some regularity from the 1960s and early 1970s, mainly by immigrants from the Spanish-speaking countries of South America and some from Central America, Mexico, Spain, and Gibraltar.

Statistics

See also
Spanish New Zealanders

References

New Zealand
Languages of New Zealand
Romance languages in Oceania